Moseley Hall can refer to:

 Moseley Hall, Birmingham, now Moseley Hall Hospital
 Moseley Old Hall, Wolverhampton
 Moseley Old Hall, Cheadle

Architectural disambiguation pages